Diego Henrique de Abreu Assis (born ), known as Dieguinho, is a Brazilian futsal player who plays for Bintang Timur Surabaya.

Honours
Intelli
Copa Libertadores de Futsal: 2013

Sporting CP
UEFA Futsal Champions League: 2018–19
Campeonato Nacional da I Divisão de Futsal: 2017–18

Brazil
Grand Prix de Futsal: 2018

References

External links
Sporting CP profile

1989 births
Living people
Futsal forwards
Sportspeople from Minas Gerais
Brazilian men's futsal players
Minas Tênis Clube players
ADC Intelli players
Sporting CP futsal players
Brazilian expatriates in Portugal